Maria Fernandes (born 27 April 1969) is a Paralympic athlete from Portugal. She mainly competes in category T38 sprint events.

Fernandes competed in the 2000 Summer Paralympics in Sydney, Australia. There she won a bronze medal in the women's 400 metres - T38 event, finished fifth in the women's 100 metres - T38 event and finished seventh in the women's 200 metres - T38 event. She also competed at the 2008 Summer Paralympics in Beijing, China, where she went out in the first round of the women's 100 metres - T38 event and finished eighth in the women's 200 metres - T38 event.

In 2013, Fernandes again represented Portugal when she attended the IPC Athletics World Championships in Lyon, France. There she entered the long jump, finishing third to take the bronze medal.

References

External links
 

Paralympic athletes of Portugal
Athletes (track and field) at the 2000 Summer Paralympics
Athletes (track and field) at the 2008 Summer Paralympics
Paralympic bronze medalists for Portugal
Portuguese female sprinters
Portuguese female long jumpers
Living people
1969 births
World record holders in Paralympic athletics
Medalists at the 2000 Summer Paralympics
Paralympic medalists in athletics (track and field)